Persoonia trinervis is a species of flowering plant in the family Proteaceae and is endemic to the south-west of Western Australia. It is an erect, sometimes spreading shrub with densely hairy young branchlets, spatula-shaped or lance-shaped leaves with the narrower end towards the base, and densely hairy yellow flowers.

Description
Flowering occurs from September to December and the fruit is a smooth, oval drupe.

Taxonomy
Persoonia trinervis was first formally described in 1856 by Carl Meissner in de Candolle'sProdromus Systematis Naturalis Regni Vegetabilis from specimens collected by James Drummond in the Swan River Colony.

Distribution and habitat
This geebung grows in heath and mallee woodland in the area between Mount Peron near Jurien Bay, Lake Grace, Frank Hann National Park and Watheroo in the south-west of Western Australia.

Conservation status
Persoonia rufiflora is classified as "not threatened" by the Government of Western Australia Department of Parks and Wildlife.

References

trinervis
Flora of Western Australia
Plants described in 1856